Sergio Escobedo (10 January 1931 – 10 May 2009) was a Mexican modern pentathlete and fencer. He competed in the modern pentathlon and the team épée at the 1960 Summer Olympics. He also served as a colonel in the Mexican army.

References

External links
 

1931 births
2009 deaths
Mexican male épée fencers
Mexican male modern pentathletes
Olympic fencers of Mexico
Olympic modern pentathletes of Mexico
Modern pentathletes at the 1960 Summer Olympics
Fencers at the 1960 Summer Olympics
Mexican soldiers
Pan American Games bronze medalists for Mexico
Pan American Games medalists in modern pentathlon
Competitors at the 1959 Pan American Games
Modern pentathletes at the 1963 Pan American Games
Medalists at the 1959 Pan American Games
Medalists at the 1963 Pan American Games
20th-century Mexican people
21st-century Mexican people